Boolean differential calculus (BDC) (German:  (BDK)) is a subject field of Boolean algebra discussing changes of Boolean variables and Boolean functions.

Boolean differential calculus concepts are analogous to those of classical differential calculus, notably studying the changes in functions and variables with respect to another/others.

The Boolean differential calculus allows various aspects of dynamical systems theory such as

 automata theory on finite automata
 Petri net theory
 supervisory control theory (SCT)

to be discussed in a united and closed form, with their individual advantages combined.

History and applications 

Since then, significant advances were accomplished in both, the theory and in the application of the BDC in switching circuit design and logic synthesis.

A complementary theory of Boolean integral calculus has been developed as well.

BDC has also found uses in discrete event dynamic systems (DEDS) in digital network communication protocols.

Meanwhile, BDC has seen extensions to multi-valued variables and functions as well as to lattices of Boolean functions.

Overview 
Boolean differential operators play a significant role in BDC. They allow the application of differentials as known from classical analysis to be extended to logical functions.

The differentials  of a Boolean variable  models the relation:

 

There are no constraints in regard to the nature, the causes and consequences of a change.

The differentials  are binary. They can be used just like common binary variables.

See also 
 Boolean Algebra
 Boole's expansion theorem
 Ramadge–Wonham framework

References

Further reading 
  (14 pages)
  (462 pages)
  (9 pages) Translation of:  (9 pages)
  (18 pages)
  (NB. Also: Chemnitz, Technische Universität, Dissertation.) (147 pages)
  (15 pages)
  (392 pages)
  (xxii+232 pages)  (NB. Per  this hardcover edition has been rereleased as softcover edition in 2010.)
  (49 pages)
  (24 of 153 pages)

External links
 
  with 

Algebra
Automata (computation)
Mathematical logic
Order theory
Set theory